Grew is a surname. Notable people with the surname include:

Dessie Grew (died 1990), IRA volunteer
Henry Grew (1781–1862), Christian teacher
Joseph Grew (1880–1965), US diplomat
Mark Grew (born 1958), UK footballer
Nehemiah Grew (1641–1712), UK botanist

See also

GRU (disambiguation)
Grue (disambiguation)
Groo (disambiguation)
Grewe